Cecidochares is a genus of tephritid  or fruit flies in the family Tephritidae.

Species
Cecidochares braziliensis Aczél, 1953
Cecidochares caliginosa (Foote, 1960)
Cecidochares connexa (Macquart, 1848)
Cecidochares delta (Hendel, 1914)
Cecidochares eupatorii (Kieffer & Jörgensen, 1910)
Cecidochares fluminensis (Lima, 1934)
Cecidochares frauenfeldi (Schiner, 1868)
Cecidochares ianthina Aczél, 1953
Cecidochares latigenis Hendel, 1914
Cecidochares rufescens Bezzi, 1913
Cecidochares violacea Aczél, 1953

References

Tephritinae
Tephritidae genera
Taxa named by Mario Bezzi